St. Anne's Church, Wattala ( is a Roman Catholic church located in Wattala, Gampaha District, Sri Lanka. It was established in 1872 as another Church of the Archdiocese of Colombo. The church is dedicated to Saint Anne.

See also
St. Sebastian's Church, Wattala
St. Anne's Balika Maha Vidyalaya, Wattala
St. Anthony's College, Wattala

References

Roman Catholic churches in Sri Lanka
Tourist attractions in Western Province, Sri Lanka
20th-century Roman Catholic church buildings in Sri Lanka
Churches in Gampaha District